Wetzstein is a low mountain of Hesse, Germany. It is located north of Stadtallendorf and west of Schwalmstadt.

Mountains of Hesse